Mari Cruz Díaz ( born 24 October 1969 in Barcelona, Spain) is a retired female race walker from Spain, who won the gold medal over 10 km at the 1986 European Championships in Stuttgart.

Achievements

External links 
 
 Profile at the RFEA
 

1969 births
Living people
Athletes from Barcelona
Sportswomen from Catalonia
Spanish female racewalkers
Olympic athletes of Spain
Athletes (track and field) at the 1992 Summer Olympics
European Athletics Championships medalists
World Athletics Championships athletes for Spain